Hugh C. Barr (1878–1960), of New York City, was a stamp dealer and auctioneer who started out in the stamp business in 1900.

Selling stamps
Barr was a respected dealer and started selling stamps by auction in 1931, continuing selling by auction for the next twenty five years. Barr was responsible for selling parts of famous collections: the Match and Medicine collection of Clarence Eagle and the personal collection of fellow stamp dealer and auctioneer Percy Gray Doane.

Philatelic activity
Barr was active within the American Stamp Dealers Association and supported its participation in TIPEX in 1926 and 1936 and CIPEX in 1947. After selling his stamp business in 1956, he continued on as an advisor and expert.

Honors and awards
Hugh C. Barr was named to the American Philatelic Society Hall of Fame in 1963.

See also
 Philately
 Philatelic literature

References

 Hugh C. Barr

1878 births
1960 deaths
American stamp dealers
American philatelists
Businesspeople from New York City
American auctioneers
Philatelic auctioneers
American Philatelic Society